Taxus brevifolia, the Pacific yew or western yew, is a species of tree in the yew family Taxaceae native to the Pacific Northwest of North America. It is a small evergreen conifer, thriving in moisture and otherwise tending to take the form of a shrub.

Description
In some instances, trees with heights in excess of  occur in parks and other protected areas, quite often in gullies. The tree is extremely slow growing, and has a habit of rotting from the inside, creating hollow forms. This makes it difficult and sometimes impossible to make accurate ring counts to determine a specimen's true age. Often damaged by succession of the forest, it usually ends up in a squat, multiple-leader form, able to grow new sprouts from decapitated stumps. In its shrub form, sometimes called "yew brush", it can reproduce vegetatively via layering.

It has thin, scaly bark, red then purplish-brown, covering a thin layer of off-white sap wood with a darker heartwood that varies in color from brown to a purplish hue to deep red, or even bright orange when freshly cut.

The arils are mature 6–9 months after pollination. The seeds contained in the arils are eaten by thrushes and other birds, which disperse the hard seeds undamaged in their droppings; maturation of the arils is spread over 2–3 months, increasing the chances of successful seed dispersal. The male cones are globose,  diameter, and shed their pollen in early spring. It is mostly dioecious, but occasional individuals can be variably monoecious, or change sex with time.

Varieties 
Taxus brevifolia var. reptaneta is a shrub variety that generally occurs in the mid to upper elevation range of the typical variety,  at its southernmost occurrence in the Klamath Mountains region, and at lower elevations further north. It is distinguished from young trees of the typical variety (var. brevifolia) by its stems initially creeping along the ground for a short distance before ascending (curving) upwards and by the branches growing off to one side of the stem, usually the upper side. The epithet reptaneta is from the Latin reptans which means "creeping, prostrate, and rooting," which is exactly what this variety does; in rooting it forms yew thickets; hence, the epithet reptaneta (etum means collective place of growth) and hence the common name, thicket yew. Unlike the typical variety, thicket yew grows in abundance on open sunny avalanche shoots or ravines as well as in the forest understory. It also occurs along forest margins. In northwestern Montana, a variant of the thicket yew does not ascend upwards; rather, it remains along the ground. This is probably the ancestral form; the upright form with branches along the upper side would be the expected growth pattern that might evolve from one with stems that strictly creep along the ground since branches can only arise from the upper surface.

Taxus brevifolia var. reptaneta has been arbitrarily indicated synonymous with typical yew, T. brevifolia (var. brevifolia); there are no studies to support this view.  Even though the two varieties may be genetically distinct, some botanists recognize species or varieties only if they have different geographical ranges. For example, T. mairei var. speciosa, which occurs with the typical variety in southern China in 10 of 13 provinces, was rejected for the lack of a "geographic reason" for recognizing it even though it appears genetically distinct.

Taxus brevifolia var. reptaneta has also been proposed to be elevated to subspecies status without justification or explanation. Such a change would likely cause considerable confusion in view of the subspecies rank having already been used in the genus Taxus for defining geographically separated subspecies of a single species (T. baccata).  Further, one recommendation strongly discourages taxonomists from "elevating a 'variety' to a 'subspecies' unless there is sufficient scientific evidence to warrant such an elevation," and that "it is crucial to provide continuity."

Taxus brevifolia var. polychaeta.  Typical Taxus brevifolia, like most species in the genus, usually produces a single ovule on a complex scaly shoot, composed of a primary shoot and a secondary short shoot. To the casual observer they appear as one funnelform shoot with an ovule at the apex.  However, Taxus brevifolia var. polychaeta differs from var. brevifolia in producing a relatively longer primary shoot with as many five secondary shoots. The epithet, polychaeta, is in reference to the primary shoot resembling a polychaete worm; hence, its common name 'worm cone yew'. Variety polychaeta appears to be relatively rare. It may have been extirpated from the type locality—around Mud Bay near Olympia, Washington—as a result of urban expansion. It is also known from Northern Idaho and Sonoma County, California.

As in the case with thicket yew, worm yew has been indicated to be the same as the typical variety, but again there are no specific studies to support this conclusion.  The authority of thicket yew and worm cone yew has been involved in the study of the genus Taxus for 25 years at the time the varieties were described.

Similar species 
Yew foliage is very similar to that of Sequoia sempervirens, the coastal redwood.

Distribution and habitat 
Pacific yew is native to the Pacific Northwest. It ranges from southernmost Alaska south to Northern California, mostly in the Pacific Coast Ranges, but with isolated disjunct populations in southeast British Columbia and in Northern Idaho. Pacific yew is shade tolerant, but can also grow in sun. The tree's shade tolerance allows it to form an understory, which means that it can grow along streams providing shade to maintain water temperature.

Uses

Traditionally, the resilient and rot-resistant wood was used by Native Americans to make tools, bows (backed with sinew), arrows, and canoe paddles. Other purposes for yew included making harpoons, fishhooks, wedges, clubs, spoons, drums, snowshoes, and arrowheads. The foliage and bark was used for medicinal purposes. Members of the Pit River Tribe would sell this plant to the Ukiah. The Concow tribe calls the tree yōl’-kō (Konkow language).

Modern-day longbow makers report that a very small percentage of yew trees are of a grain suitable for their craft. The Japanese have used the wood for decorative purposes, and the Taiwanese have valued it as well.

While many parts of yews are poisonous and can be fatal if eaten, the juicy red cup around the seed seems to be edible as long as the seed within is not chewed or swallowed, with a cherry jello-like taste. Birds eat such cups and spread the seeds. Moose feed on the tree in winter in forests of the Rocky Mountains.

The chemotherapy drug paclitaxel (taxol), used in breast, ovarian, and lung cancer treatment, can be derived from Taxus brevifolia and other species of yew. As it was already becoming scarce when its chemotherapeutic potential was realized around the 1990s, the Pacific yew was never commercially harvested from its habitat at a large scale; the widespread use of the paclitaxel was enabled circa 2003 when a semi-synthetic pathway was developed from extracts of cultivated yews of other species.

Gallery

References

Further reading

 Heiken, D. (1992). The Pacific Yew and Taxol: Federal management of an emerging resource. Journal of Environmental Law and Litigation 7: 175.

External links
 
 US Forest Service: Taxus brevifolia (pdf file)
 UCLA text on "Economic Botany"

brevifolia
Trees of the Northwestern United States
Trees of the Southwestern United States
Trees of Western Canada
Trees of Alberta
Trees of Alaska
Trees of British Columbia
Trees of Subarctic America
Flora of the Sierra Nevada (United States)
Medicinal plants of North America